Josip Balić (born 8 July 1993) is a Croatian football midfielder who plays for Bruneian club DPMM FC of the Singapore Premier League.

References

External links
 

1993 births
Living people
Footballers from Split, Croatia
Association football midfielders
Croatian footballers
RNK Split players
NK Dugopolje players
NK Solin players
NK Zavrč players
NK Radomlje players
NK Krško players
FC Fastav Zlín players
FK Palanga players
Thanh Hóa FC players
FK Sloboda Tuzla players
First Football League (Croatia) players
Slovenian PrvaLiga players
Czech First League players
DPMM FC players
A Lyga players
V.League 1 players
Premier League of Bosnia and Herzegovina players
Croatian expatriate footballers
Expatriate footballers in Slovenia
Croatian expatriate sportspeople in Slovenia
Expatriate footballers in the Czech Republic
Croatian expatriate sportspeople in the Czech Republic
Expatriate footballers in Lithuania
Croatian expatriate sportspeople in Lithuania
Expatriate footballers in Vietnam
Croatian expatriate sportspeople in Vietnam
Expatriate footballers in Bosnia and Herzegovina
Croatian expatriate sportspeople in Bosnia and Herzegovina
Expatriate footballers in Brunei
Croatian expatriate sportspeople in Brunei